Gabrielle Smith (born October 24, 1994) is a Canadian rower from Unionville, Ontario.

Career
At the 2019 World Rowing Championships, Smith along with partner Andrea Proske finished fourth in the women's double sculls, qualifying the boat for the 2020 Olympics.

Smith took part in the 2021 edition of The Boat Race as a member of the Oxford crew. She completed a MSc in Water Science, Policy and Management at Oxford, having previously studied at McGill University.

In June 2021, Smith was named to Canada's 2020 Olympic team in the women's double sculls with partner Jessica Sevick. Andrea Proske, her partner from 2019, was instead named to the eights boat.

References

External links

1994 births
Canadian female rowers
Living people
Rowers from Toronto
Olympic rowers of Canada
Rowers at the 2020 Summer Olympics
McGill University alumni
Alumni of Regent's Park College, Oxford
21st-century Canadian women
World Rowing Championships medalists for Canada